Santa Rita, California may refer to:
Santa Rita, Salinas, California
Santa Rita, Santa Barbara County, California
Sta. Rita Hills AVA, California wine region in Santa Barbara County
Santa Rita Jail, a county jail in Alameda County